A resignation is the formal act of giving up or quitting one's office or position.

Resignation may also refer to:
 "Resignation" (House), the twenty-second episode of the third season of House
 The Resignation, a 2003 Rx Bandits album
 Resignation (Friedrich Schiller), a poem by Friedrich Schiller
 Resignation syndrome, a dissociative syndrome that induces a catatonic state
 General George Washington Resigning His Commission, an 1824 painting by John Trumbull

Resign may also refer to:
 Resign (chess), the concession of a loss of a game of chess before it proceeds to checkmate
 "Resigned" (album), an album from 1997 by singer-songwriter Michael Penn